The Cricketer was a monthly English language cricket magazine published in Karachi, Pakistan. It was founded in 1972 by Riaz Ahmed Mansuri. The first issue was published in April 1972. It was first edited by the noted, then retired Pakistani cricketer Hanif Mohammad and later by the statistician and cricket historian Gul Hameed Bhatti.

The magazine closed in April 2008 after 36 years in publication. An Urdu version of the Cricketer Pakistan was also launched in March 1979 and was shut down in June 2018.

References

1972 establishments in Pakistan
2008 disestablishments in Pakistan
Defunct cricket magazines
Defunct magazines published in Pakistan
Magazines established in 1972
Magazines disestablished in 2008
Mass media in Karachi
Sports magazines published in Pakistan
Monthly magazines published in Pakistan
English-language magazines published in Pakistan